Godnow Bridge railway station was a small railway station on the line between Doncaster and Keadby, between Medge Hall Halt and Crowle. The area is shown on old maps as "Godknow Bridge". It was opened with the line from Thorne (Old) railway station in September 1859 and closed in 1917.

References 

"The South Yorkshire Railway", D.L.Franks, 1971. Turntable Enterprises, 

Disused railway stations in the Borough of North Lincolnshire
Former South Yorkshire Railway stations
Railway stations in Great Britain opened in 1859
Railway stations in Great Britain closed in 1917